Cameron G. Holt is a retired United States Air Force major general who last served as the deputy assistant secretary for contracting of the United States Air Force. Previously, he was the commander of the Air Force Installation Contracting Agency.

References

Living people
Place of birth missing (living people)
Recipients of the Legion of Merit
United States Air Force generals
United States Air Force personnel of the War in Afghanistan (2001–2021)
Year of birth missing (living people)